Events in the year 1949 in Portugal.

Incumbents
President: Óscar Carmona
Prime Minister: António de Oliveira Salazar

Events
13 February - Presidential election.
28 October – 1949 Air France Lockheed Constellation crash
13 November – Portuguese legislative election, 1949.

Arts and entertainment

Sports
G.D. Chaves founded

Births

30 April – António Guterres, politician

Deaths
7 January – José Ramos Preto, politician (born 1871)
4 August – Liberato Pinto, politician (born 1880)

References

 
1940s in Portugal
Portugal
Years of the 20th century in Portugal
Portugal